is a 1987 Japanese film directed by Jun Ichikawa. It is Ichikawa's first feature film.

Awards
9th Yokohama Film Festival
Won: Best Actress - Yasuko Tomita
2nd Best Film

References

1987 films
Films directed by Jun Ichikawa
1980s Japanese-language films
1980s Japanese films